Shalako is a series of dances and ceremonies conducted by the Native American Zuni people for the Zuni people at the winter solstice, typically following the harvest. The Shalako ceremony and feast has been closed to non-native peoples since 1990.  However, non-native peoples may be invited as guests by a Zuni tribal member.

Nancy Bonvillain described the Shalakos, "They brought good fortune, abundant crops, and many children."  They are chosen at Winter Solstice, when they begin to learn the chants they will recite in the early December ceremony.

The Shálako festival, on or about December 1, is a remarkable sacred drama, enacted in the open for the double purpose of invoking the divine blessing upon certain newly built houses, and of rendering thanks to the gods for the harvests of the year. The exact date of the Shálako is fixed each year by a formula of the Zuni Bow priests, which traditionally was the 49th day past the tenth full moon, but has been altered to the weekend nearest the 49th day past the tenth full moon, as many Zuni people work away from their Reservation at jobs that do not allow them weekdays off. The official publication of the date is not made until the eighth evening before the event. The immediate effect of this announcement, which is given out by ten people in the principal plazas, is to quicken the easy-going life of the old pueblo into a bustle of industry.

The Koyemshi
Nine offspring and the father, Awan Tatchu, constitute the Koyemshi of Zuni mythology, who accompany and interpret the kachinas.  The children have characteristics of their father, dun-colored and marked with welts, they include Awan Pekwin (Priest-speaker of the Sun), Awan Pithlashiwanni (Bow Priest-warrior), Eshotsi (the Bat), Itsepasha (the Glum or Aggrieved), Kalutsi (the Suckling), Tsathlashi (Old-youth), Muyapona (Wearer of the Eyelets of Invisibility), Posuki (the Pouter), and Nalashi (Aged Buck).

Council of the Gods
Shulawitsi, Little Fire God, and his father, Shulawatsi An Tatchu, precede the Shalako.  Shulawitsi, portrayed by a young boy carrying cedar bark torches, lights preparatory fires.  They are followed by Saiyatasha or Longhorn, Rain Priest of the North, and Hututu, Rain Priest of the South, accompanied by a Yamuhakto, their helpers.  All are protected by the Salimopia, Warriors of the Six Directions.  They are called Salimopia Shelow'ona (from the south), Salimopia Kohan'ona (from the east), Salimopia Thlian'ona (from the west), Salimopia Thluptsin'ona (from the north), Salimopia Shikan'ona (from the nadir), and Salimopia Itapanahnan'ona (from the zenith).

The Shalako
Each kiva selects two men, one to portray one of the six Shalakos, and one who alternates in the role, the Shalako Anuthlona.   They appear after the Council of the Gods complete their journey around the village at dusk.  They approach the village from the south, coming down Greasy Hill.  Each Shalako enters their designated house, and chants commence recounting the creation of the Zuni, and their search for the Middle.  After midnight, a feast is consumed by all, followed with dancing by the Shalako.  The ceremony finishes at dawn when Saiyatasha completes his final prayer.

References

Additional reading
Charles Francis Saunders, The Indians of the Terraced Houses, Chapter XVI: Of the Night Dance of the Shálako Gods, pp. 153–166. G.P. Putnam's Sons, 1912.

See also
Dance Hall of the Dead

External links
The Spirit of the Zuni Pueblo

Native American dances
Native American religion
Zuni culture
Zuni tribe
December events
November events